On August 31, 2020, Ronald Merle McNutt, a 33-year-old American man, committed suicide by shooting himself under the chin with a rifle on a Facebook livestream, which went viral on social media platforms.

The case became notable for both the callous attitude expressed towards McNutt's death by some internet users, as well as Facebook's slow response to the video, which had been shared to numerous other platforms and amassed a large view count before finally being taken down.

Video platform TikTok was also slow to respond to the video, which had appeared in many user feeds and constant re-uploads, leading to many users choosing to boycott the platform. The case has raised awareness about both suicide prevention and what duty of care social media platforms owe to protect users and victims' reputations online when it comes to graphic content.

Life and career
Ronald Merle McNutt (May 23, 1987 – August 31, 2020) was a resident of New Albany, Mississippi in the United States, and had served in the United States military in Iraq. McNutt worked at a Toyota plant. He was known to have suffered from a variety of mental health problems, such as depression as well as post-traumatic stress disorder (PTSD), the latter of which was a direct consequence of his time served in the Iraq War in 2007 and 2008. In addition to this, he was also dealing with a recent break-up with his girlfriend; some media reports also said that he lost his job during the COVID-19 pandemic, though Rolling Stone disputed this. McNutt was a Christian who regularly attended church.

Suicide
On August 31, 2020, McNutt began a livestream on Facebook. His best friend, Joshua Steen, noticed the stream. He did not initially find it unusual as McNutt had routinely done livestreams in the past, but he became alarmed when he realized that McNutt was intoxicated and holding a single-shot rifle . Steen allegedly attempted to intervene numerous times, particularly when McNutt misfired the rifle, hoping that Facebook would cut off the stream and end the video feed, preventing people from seeing into McNutt's home while Steen sought police intervention. Facebook refused to cut the stream, claiming that the stream was not in any violation of its platform's guidelines.

As the stream went on, McNutt's mobile phone rang frequently. The last call he received was from his ex-girlfriend to which he answered, leading to a brief argument between the two. After the exchange, the woman ended the call on McNutt, and in response he took hold of the rifle and addressed the audience for the last time, saying, "Hey guys, I guess that's it!" before proceeding to aim the rifle under the chin and fatally shoot himself. The shot blew his face apart as blood splattered all over the camera. 

Almost immediately afterwards, the phone he'd left on his desk began to ring. A pet dog owned by McNutt's friend wandered into frame shortly after the gunshot. The stream had been captured by multiple users.

The New Albany Police Department had been called to the scene during the livestream, but did not enter McNutt's apartment until after they heard the fatal gunshot, his phone was still ringing as officers searched the crime scene. Police Chief Chris Robertson reported that his officers had secured the perimeter and evacuated nearby residents before attempting to communicate with McNutt via speakerphone, to no avail.

A final message by Ronnie McNutt was later discovered on Facebook, declaring, "Someone in your life needs to hear that they matter. That they are loved. That they have a future. Be the one to tell them".

Two days after his suicide, McNutt was buried in Snowdown Church of Christ Cemetery in Prentiss County, Mississippi.

Viral spread
The video of McNutt's suicide was uploaded by users across social media platforms such as Facebook, YouTube, TikTok, and Instagram, often as a short video clip set to pop up in the feeds of unsuspecting users. 

According to Heavy, Facebook also initially refused to prevent the spread of recorded video of McNutt's misfire and suicide but later agreed to remove the videos from its platform. McNutt had not expressed any intent for the viral spread to occur. Variants of the video appeared in TikTok's "For You" page, so that users would scroll upon it without warning as the suicide automatically played, with the apparent intention of frightening or upsetting viewers as a form of trolling. The #ronniemcnutt hashtag had 15.6 million views on TikTok within the first few days after the suicide.

Though the platforms worked to remove the videos, new uploads of it would appear from separate accounts, while links to the video also began to appear in Reddit's true crime communities. As TikTok caught onto the video with its algorithms, uploaders evaded detection by placing the video after pictures of unrelated, innocuous content.

Public response
The incident was compared to the filmed suicides of anchorwoman Christine Chubbuck and politician R. Budd Dwyer. A large margin of the response online was one of sympathy towards McNutt, with users using the case as an opportunity to discuss mental health and suicide prevention, as well as concern over the video's prevalence online. Some TikTok users announced boycotts of the platform until the suicide video was completely taken down, while other users began posting prayers and messages of respect and commemoration for McNutt in the comments sections of the video uploads.

Many parents reported that their children were highly distressed after encountering the video, with one girl becoming physically ill and needing to sleep with the lights on. Another parent argued that she fears her children, who accidentally discovered the video on TikTok, may have post-traumatic stress disorder. Institute of Mums circulated further warnings for parents about seemingly benign video content hiding the McNutt video, stating, "Alarmingly, there are also reports of the video being sandwiched in the middle of cute and funny cat videos, which begin with viewer-friendly footage before quickly changing to the disturbing suicide." Then Australian Prime Minister Scott Morrison called the video something that "no child should be exposed to", while cybersecurity expert Susan McLean publicly recommended that parents prevent minor children from accessing the TikTok app until the video was fully removed.

Liability
The case sparked a debate over what legal liability is owed by internet platforms that fail to promptly remove graphic and disturbing footage from public view, with the blame generally being placed on Facebook for failing to cut off the livestream during the initial suicide attempt itself. Joshua Steen had called Facebook multiple times, and had called the police, neither of which stopped the stream before McNutt had already committed suicide. Steen declared, "if some woman posts a topless photo, their software will detect that, remove it, and ban their account. That's apparently more offensive than my friend killing himself." It was argued by the two platforms that the "dark web" was responsible for the ongoing circulation of the video.

TikTok released a public statement saying, "Our systems have been automatically detecting and flagging these clips for violating our policies against content that displays, praises, glorifies, or promotes suicide. We appreciate our community members who've reported content and warned others against watching, engaging or sharing such videos on any platform, out of respect for the person and their family." Facebook, likewise, publicly stated, "We removed the original video from Facebook last month, on the day it was streamed, and have used automation technology to remove copies and uploads since that time. Our thoughts remain with Ronnie's family and friends during this difficult time."

Similar incidents 

 1974: Newsanchor Christine Chubbuck shot herself live on the news behind the ear with a .38-caliber revolver, believed to be the first televised suicide.
 1987: Politician and state treasurer of Pennsylvania R. Budd Dwyer, facing a sentence of up to 55 years' imprisonment and a $300,000 fine after a conspiracy, mail fraud, perjury, and racketeering conviction, shot himself through the mouth with a .357 magnum, also live on the news.
 2007: Kevin Whitrick, 42, died by suicide after hanging himself on a WeChat insult room.
 2008: Abraham Biggs, 19, died by suicide after consuming significant quantities of prescription drugs, and streaming his suicide live on Justin.tv under the name feels_like_ecstacy. Before he fell unconscious and subsequently died, Biggs was also chatting on a bodybuilding forum, where he had reportedly threatened suicide on numerous occasions.
 2010: A 21-year-old man named Marcus Jannes from Järna, Stockholm, hanged himself and livestreamed it after making a post on the Internet forum Flashback.org, in which he wrote that he had swallowed some painkillers and was going to hang himself.
 2016: A 22-year-old Turkish man named Erdogan Ceren killed himself with a shot to the heart in a Facebook livestream (on October 10, 2016, around 3pm) after his girlfriend cheated and broke up with him.
 2016: Océane Ebem, an 18-year-old woman from Égly in the suburbs of Paris, livestreamed a video testimonial claiming she was sexually assaulted before throwing herself under a train.
 2016: Katelyn Nicole Davis, a 12-year-old girl from Polk County, Georgia who livestreamed her hanging herself on 30 December 2016.
 2018: Shuaib Aslam, an 18-year-old Pakistani-American who lived in Stockton, California shot himself with a Kel-Tec KSG shotgun and livestreamed it on YouTube while simultaneously being on a VC with his friends.
 2019: Gleb Korablev, an 18-year-old university student from Moscow, Russia, livestreamed himself on social media network VK died by suicide via self inflicted gunshot wound to the head. The video was notorious for sparking an internet legend claiming it is cursed. The video has been flipped several times by editing. This makes it very hard to find the original.
 2019: A young man from Sindh, Pakistan named Muneer Ahmad Kalor shot himself with a handgun on Facebook Live after a fight with his friend.
 2021: A 28-year-old man from San Diego, California named Angel Hernandez Grado died by suicide on Instagram since he allegedly held his girlfriend captive for two days.
 2021: A Chinese influencer named Luo Xiao Mao Mao Zi drank pesticides while livestreaming.

References

1987 births
2020 deaths
2020 controversies
2020 in Mississippi
2020 suicides
August 2020 events in the United States
Deaths by person in Mississippi
Facebook criticisms and controversies
Filmed deaths in the United States
Filmed suicides
Internet memes introduced in 2020
Internet-related controversies
Privacy controversies and disputes
Suicides by firearm in Mississippi
Victims of cyberbullying